Bitterblue is the eighth studio album by Welsh singer Bonnie Tyler. It was released on 11 November 1991, through Hansa Records. Bitterblue is a pop rock album, described by Dieter Bohlen as "more commercial" than her previous albums. Bohlen began working with Tyler in early 1991, writing and producing multiple songs for the album. Bitterblue also features compositions from Albert Hammond, Nik Kershaw and Giorgio Moroder.

Bitterblue received mixed reviews from music critics, with the songs being complimented but the production criticised. The album had major success in mainland Europe, where it reached number one in Austria and Norway. In 1992 it was certified 3× Platinum by IFPI Norway. Three singles were released from the album, including the hits "Bitterblue" and "Against the Wind".

Writing and recording
Tyler signed to Hansa Records in 1990. Bitterblue was her first multi-producer album, with contributions from Dieter Bohlen, Luis Rodríguez, Roy Bittan, David Yorath, Giorgio Moroder and Nik Kershaw. Bohlen claimed that Tyler was reluctant to record his songs as she perceived them to be more commercial-sounding than her previous work. The title track includes elements of Scottish folk music, including bagpipes and accordion, and was inspired by the Rod Stewart hit "Rhythm of My Heart".

Bitterblue was the first of three albums that Tyler recorded with Bohlen. His songwriting and production work was often credited under the names Howard Houston, Steve Benson and Jennifer Blake. Tyler claimed that Bohlen chose to disguise his involvement to avoid radio DJs developing preconceptions about the album.

Bitterblue was recorded at five recording studios located in Germany, the UK and in the US. Bohlen wrote, recorded and produced his own songs, with Luis Rodríguez acting as co-producer on three tracks. Nik Kershaw, Giorgio Moroder David Yorath all wrote and produced their own songs. Songs written by Albert Hammond and Diane Warren were produced by Roy Bittan at Conway and A&M Studios in Los Angeles. Tyler recorded "Heaven Is Here" as a duet with Moroder, and "Till the End of Time" with Dan Hartman. Both songs were written by Moroder. Tyler also co-wrote the lyrics for "Whenever You Need Me" with David Madiran.

Critical reception 

Tomas Mureika of AllMusic rated the album three and a half stars out of five, describing the album as "a pleasant collection of pop tunes." He opined that her pairing with Giorgio Moroder "[gave] Tyler's work a contemporary sheen that frames her vocals within the songs." Mureika concluded that Bitterblue is "better than most pop records," but not as strong as her work with Jim Steinman and Desmond Child. In a review of the lead single, Billboard criticised Bohlen's production; "bombastic production, with a rush of bagpipes and a choir of chirping children at the forefront, overpower Tyler's distinctive raspy voice."

Track listing

Personnel 
Credits adapted from AllMusic.

Technical and Design
 Dieter Bohlen (as Howard Houston) – recording (1, 13), mixing (1, 13)
 Dieter Bohlen – recording (2, 9, 14), mixing (2, 9, 14)
 Luis Rodriguez – recording (2, 9, 14), mixing (2, 9, 14)
 Phil Kaffel – engineer and recording (3, 5, 6), mixing (3, 5, 6)
 David Yorath – recording (4), mixing (4)
 Stuart Bruce – recording (7), mixing (7)
 Brian Reeves – engineer (8, 10, 11, 12), mixing (8, 10, 11, 12)
 Giorgio Moroder – mixing (8, 10, 11, 12)
 Thomas Sassenbach – art direction 
 Aaron's Outfit – design 
 Ariola – design
 Markus Amon – photography 
 Jeff Weiss – photography 
 David Aspden – management 

Musicians and Vocals
 Bonnie Tyler – vocals
 Roy Bittan – keyboards (3, 5, 6), arrangements (3, 5, 6)
 Richard Cottle – keyboards (7)
 Nik Kershaw – keyboards (7), programming (7), guitars (7), arrangements (7)
 Scott Greer – programming (8, 10, 11, 12)
 Giorgio Moroder – programming (8, 10, 11, 12) - vocals (10)
 John Pierce – guitars (3, 5, 6)
 Waddy Wachtel – guitars (3, 5, 6)
 Tim Pierce – acoustic guitar (3, 5, 6)
 Teddy Castellucci – guitars (8, 10, 11, 12)
 Randy Jackson – bass (3, 6, 6)
 Kenny Aronoff – drums (3, 5, 6)
 Gary Herbig – saxophone (8, 10, 11, 12)
 Dieter Bohlen – arrangements (as Howard Houston on 1, 13), arrangements (2, 9, 14)
 David Yorath – arrangements (4)
 Jackie Challenor – backing vocals (7)
 Miriam Stockley – backing vocals (7)
 Debbie McGlendon-Smith – backing vocals (8, 10, 11, 12)
 Joe Pizzulo – backing vocals (8, 10, 11, 12)
 Marietta Waters – backing vocals (8, 10, 11, 12)
 Dan Hartman – vocals (12)

Charts

Weekly charts

Year-end charts

Certifications

Release history

Accolades 
RSH Gold Award

|-
|1992 
|Bitterblue
|Most successful German produced interpreter female
|
|}

Notes

References 

 
 

1991 albums
Bonnie Tyler albums
Albums produced by Giorgio Moroder
Albums produced by Roy Bittan
Hansa Records albums